Coleophora ovata is a moth of the family Coleophoridae.

References

ovata
Moths described in 1994